Qeshlaq-e Padar Hajji Bahrish (also Romanized as Qeshlāq-e Pādār Ḩājjī Bahrīsh) is a village in Qeshlaq-e Sharqi Rural District, Qeshlaq Dasht District, Bileh Savar County, Ardabil Province, Iran. At the 2006 census, its population was 94, in 20 families.

References 

Populated places in Bileh Savar County
Towns and villages in Bileh Savar County